Gyula Takács (born September 4, 1914, date of death unknown) was a Hungarian field handball player who competed in the 1936 Summer Olympics. He was part of the Hungarian field handball team, which finished fourth in the Olympic tournament. He played four matches.

References
Gyula Takács's profile at the Hungarian Olympic Committee
Gyula Takács's profile at Sports Reference.com

1914 births
Year of death missing
Field handball players at the 1936 Summer Olympics
Hungarian male handball players
Olympic handball players of Hungary